Ikaw ay Pag-Ibig  is a 2011 Philippine family fantasy drama television series directed by Jerome Chavez Pobocan, Jojo A. Saguin, and Erick C. Salud. The series stars child actors Zaijian Jaranilla, Mutya Orquia, Louise Abuel, and Xyriel Manabat, with an ensemble cast consisting of Dimples Romana, Alfred Vargas, Mark Gil, Paulo Avelino, Bembol Roco, Yen Santos, Beverly Salviejo, Gerald Pesigan, Izzy Canillo, and Pen Medina in their supporting roles. The series premiered on ABS-CBN's Primetime Bida nighttime block, replacing 100 Days to Heaven from November 21, 2011, to January 27, 2012.

Series overview

Episodes

2011

2012

References

Ikaw ay Pag-Ibig
Ikaw ay Pag-Ibig
2010s television-related lists